The following outline is provided as an overview of and topical guide to Ottawa:

Ottawa – capital city of Canada. It is located in Southern Ontario on the southern shore of the Ottawa River. Ottawa was historically an indigenous trading spot for the Algonquin and Mississaugas. Its modern history began in 1610 when the first European settler came to the area. In 1826 was founded as Bytown, and incorporated as Ottawa in 1855.

General reference 
 Pronunciation:

Geography of Ottawa 

Geography of Ottawa
 Ottawa is: a city in Ontario and the national capital of Canada

Location of Ottawa 

 Ottawa is situated in the following regions:
 Northern Hemisphere, Western Hemisphere
 Americas
 North America
 Northern America
 Laurentia
 Canada
 Central Canada
 Eastern Canada
 Canadian Shield
 Ontario
 Southern Ontario
 Eastern Ontario
 Nation Capital Region
 Time zone:  Eastern Standard Time (UTC-05), Eastern Daylight Time (UTC-04)

Geographic features of Ottawa 
 Geography of Ottawa
 Native trees in Ottawa
 Ottawa River
 Rideau River
 Jock River
 Carp River
 Mississippi River
 Madawaska River
 Castor River
 Rideau Canal
 Dow's Lake
 Chaudière Falls
 Rideau Falls
 Hog's Back Falls

Areas of Ottawa 
 Neighbourhoods in Ottawa

 Wards of the City of Ottawa
 Orléans Ward 
 Innes Ward
 Barrhaven Ward 
 Kanata North Ward
 West Carleton-March Ward
 Stittsville Ward
 Bay Ward
 College Ward
 Knoxdale-Merivale Ward
 Gloucester-Southgate Ward
 Beacon Hill-Cyrville Ward
 Rideau-Vanier Ward 
 Rideau-Rockcliffe Ward
 Somerset Ward
 Kitchissippi Ward
 River Ward
 Capital Ward
 Alta Vista Ward
 Cumberland Ward
 Osgoode Ward
 Rideau-Goulbourn Ward
 Gloucester-South Nepean Ward
 Kanata South Ward
 Former cities, townships, and villages prior to amalgamation 
 Regional Municipality of Ottawa–Carleton
 City of Ottawa
 Nepean
 Kanata
 Gloucester
 Vanier
 Cumberland
 Rockcliffe Park
 West Carleton
 Goulbourn
 Rideau
 Osgoode

Locations in Ottawa 
 Museums in Ottawa
National museums in Ottawa
 Ottawa Public Library branches
 Shopping malls in Ottawa

Parks in Ottawa 
 Parks in Ottawa
 Capital Pathway
 Ottawa Greenbelt
 Mer Bleue Conservation Area
 Gatineau Park

Historic locations in Ottawa 
 List of historic places in Ottawa
 List of designated heritage properties in Ottawa
 List of National Historic Sites of Canada in Ottawa

Government and politics of Ottawa 
Government and politics of Ottawa
 Municipal elections of Ottawa
 List of mayors of Ottawa
 Ottawa City Council
 Ottawa City Council members
 National Capital Commission
 List of diplomatic missions in Ottawa

History of Ottawa 
 History of Ottawa
 Timeline of Ottawa history
 Great 1900 Fire of Ottawa
 Parliament building fire 1916
 1929 Ottawa explosion
 Greber Plan

Culture in Ottawa

Architecture 
 Architecture of Ottawa
 List of tallest buildings in Ottawa
 List of buildings in Ottawa

Demographics of Ottawa 
 Demographics of Ottawa
 Bilingualism in Ottawa
 List of people from Ottawa

Arts 
 List of festivals in Ottawa
 Media in Ottawa–Gatineau
 Museums in Ottawa
 Symbols of Ottawa
 Flag of Ottawa
 Coat of arms of Ottawa
 Cinemas in Ottawa
 Ottawa International Film Festival
 Ottawa International Animation Festival
 Canadian Film Institute

Music of Ottawa 
 Ottawa Bluesfest
 CityFolk Festival
 Ottawa Jazz Festival
 Escapade Music Festival

Religion in Ottawa 
 List of religious buildings in Ottawa
 Christianity in Ottawa
 List of Ottawa churches
 Roman Catholic Archdiocese of Ottawa
 Anglican Diocese of Ottawa
 Judaism in Ottawa
 List of synagogues in Ottawa
 History of the Jews in Ottawa
 Islam in Ottawa
 List of mosques in Ottawa

Sports in Ottawa 
Sport in Ottawa
 Ice hockey in Ottawa
 Ottawa Senators (National Hockey League)
 List of Ottawa Senators seasons
 List of Ottawa Senators players
 List of Ottawa Senators head coaches
 List of Ottawa Senators general managers
 History of the Ottawa Senators (1992–)
 List of Ottawa Senators records
 List of Ottawa Senators award winners
 List of Ottawa Senators draft picks
 Ottawa Senators (original)
 Ottawa 67's (Ontario Hockey League)
 Basketball in Ottawa
 Ottawa Blackjacks (Canadian Elite Basketball League)
 Football in Ottawa
 Ottawa Redblacks (Canadian Football League)
 List of Ottawa Redblacks seasons
 Ottawa Redblacks all-time records and statistics
 Ottawa Football Clubs all-time records and statistics
 Soccer in Ottawa
 Atlético Ottawa (Canadian Premier League)
 Running in Ottawa
 Ottawa Race Weekend

Economy and infrastructure of Ottawa

Ottawa Economy 
 List of companies based in Ottawa

Services in Ottawa 
 List of hospitals in Ottawa
 Ottawa Fire Services
 Ottawa Police Service
 Ottawa Paramedic Service
 Ottawa Public Library

Tourism in Ottawa 
 List of tourist attractions in Ottawa
 Casino du Lac-Leamy
 Hard Rock Casino

Transportation in Ottawa 
 Transportation in Ottawa
 List of airports in the Ottawa area
 List of roads in Ottawa
 List of numbered roads in Ottawa
 List of bridges in Ottawa
 List of crossings of the Ottawa River
 OC Transpo 
 OC Transpo routes
 Paratranspo
 Transitway (Ottawa)
 O-Train
 Trillium Line
 Confederation Line
 List of O-Train stations
 Société de transport de l'Outaouais
 Ottawa station
 Fallowfield station

Education in Ottawa 
 List of schools in Ottawa
 Elementary and secondary public schools in Ottawa
 Ottawa-Carleton District School Board
 List of schools of the Ottawa-Carleton District School Board
 Ottawa Catholic School Board
 List of schools of the Ottawa Catholic School Board
 Conseil des écoles publiques de l'Est de l'Ontario
 List of schools of the Conseil des écoles publiques de l'Est de l'Ontario
 Conseil des écoles catholiques de langue française du Centre-Est
 List of schools of the Conseil des écoles catholiques de langue française du Centre-Est

Universities and Colleges 
 University of Ottawa
 University of Ottawa Faculty of Social Sciences
 University of Ottawa Faculty of Medicine
 Telfer School of Management
 University of Ottawa Faculty of Law
 Ottawa Gee-Gees
 Saint Paul University
 List of University of Ottawa people
 Carleton University
 Sprott School of Business
 Norman Paterson School of International Affairs
 Carleton Ravens
 Dominican University College
 List of Carleton University people
 Algonquin College
 Collège La Cité

See also 
 Outline of geography
 Outline of North America
 Outline of Canada
 Outline of Ontario
 Franco-Ontarian
 List of francophone communities in Ontario

External links 

 , the official City of Ottawa web site
 Ottawa Tourism, by the Ottawa Tourism and Convention Authority

Ottawa
Ottawa
Ottawa